Pedro Mutindi (born June 30, 1954) is an Angolan politician who is currently serving as Governor of the Province of Cuando Cubango.

References

1954 births
Living people
Governors of Cuando Cubango
Governors of Cunene
Tourism ministers of Angola
MPLA politicians